Arthur Smith's Balham Bash is a comedy and music show hosted by Arthur Smith. It is recorded at his own house in Balham, London, and features both stand-up comedy and musical acts. Three series were broadcast on BBC Radio 4 from 2009 to 2011. Other than Smith, the only other regular on the show is Pippa Evans, performing as singer-songerwriter Loretta Maine.

References

External links

BBC Radio comedy programmes
2009 radio programme debuts
BBC Radio 4 programmes
BBC Radio 4 Extra programmes
2009 in London
Balham